The women's field hockey tournament at the 2000 Summer Olympics was the 6th edition of the field hockey event for women at the Summer Olympic Games. It was held over a fourteen-day period beginning on 16 September, and culminating with the medal finals on 29 September. All games were played at the hockey centre within the Olympic Park in Sydney, Australia.

Defending champions Australia won the gold medal for the third time after defeating Argentina 3–1 in the final. The Netherlands won the bronze medal by defeating Spain 2–0.

Qualification
Each of the continental champions from five federations and the host nation received an automatic berth. Along with the teams qualifying through the Olympic Qualification Tournament, ten teams competed in this tournament.

 – Australia qualified both as host and continental champion, therefore that quota was added to the ones awarded by the Olympic Qualification Tournament to a total of 5.

Squads

Results
All times are Eastern Daylight Time (UTC+11:00)

First round

Pool A

Pool B

Seventh to tenth place classification

Crossover

Ninth and tenth place

Seventh and eighth place

Medal round

Pool C

China and New Zealand finished fifth and sixth respectively in this tournament.

Bronze medal match

Gold medal match

Final standings

Goalscorers

References

External links

Official FIH website

 
Women's Tournament
2000
International women's field hockey competitions hosted by Australia
2000 in women's field hockey
2000 in Australian women's field hockey
hockey